Thomas Bruce Crawford (2 September 1879 – 24 February 1969) was an Australian rules footballer who played with Melbourne in the Victorian Football League (VFL).

Notes

External links 

1879 births
1969 deaths
Australian rules footballers from Victoria (Australia)
Melbourne Football Club players